The 2000 European Individual Speedway Junior Championship was the third edition of the Championship.

Qualification
 	Qualifying round:
May 6, 2000
 Debrecen
Semi-Final A:
May 21, 2000
 Glumso
Semi-Final B:
August 20, 2000
 Heusden-Zolder

Final
August 27, 2000
 Ljubljana

References

2000
Euro I J